Betti is a given name. Notable people with the name include:

Betti Alisjahbana (born 1960), Indonesian business executive
Betti Alver (1906–1989), Estonian poet
Betti-Sue Hertz, American art curator and art historian
Betti Sheldon (1935–2000), American politician

See also
Bette (given name)
Betty, given name